QSO B0839+187 (PKS 0839+187) is a quasar that was used for a VLBI experiment conducted by Edward Fomalont and Sergei Kopeikin in September 2002. They claimed to measure the speed of gravity, but this is disputed.

References

Quasars
Cancer (constellation)
2825583